Rear Admiral Edward Graham Ahlgren,  (born 5 August 1971) is a senior Royal Navy officer who has served as Commander Operations since April 2022.

He was educated at Rossall School and King's College London (MA Defence Studies, 2011).

Naval career
Educated at Rossall School, Ahlgren joined the Royal Navy on 1 January 1992. After a tour on counter-terrorism duties in Bahrain, he became Defence attaché at the British Embassy in Cairo. He then became deputy commander of Combined Maritime Forces in February 2021 and Commander Operations in April 2022.

He was appointed an Officer of the Order of the British Empire in the 2011 Birthday Honours.

References

1971 births
Living people
People educated at Rossall School
Alumni of King's College London
Officers of the Order of the British Empire
Royal Navy rear admirals